Hamad Rashid Mohamed (born 1 March 1950) is a Tanzanian politician.

In July 2015, he defected from the Civic United Front to the Alliance for Democratic Change.

References

1950 births
Living people
Civic United Front MPs
Tanzanian MPs 2000–2005
Tanzanian MPs 2005–2010
Tanzanian MPs 2010–2015
Fidel Castro Secondary School alumni
Zanzibari politicians